Hans Caspar Hirzel (21 March 1725 - 18 February 1803), also known or spelt as - Herzil John Caspar, Kaspar Hirzel, Johann Kasper Herzel, or John Kaspar Hirzel, was an eminent Swiss physician and writer on rural economy.

Biography
Hirzel was born in Zürich in 1725 and adopted the medical profession by his learning and intelligence. He distinguished himself in lecturing on the theory and practice of medicine, including instructions to midwives. He was one of the principal founders of the Helvetic Society in 1726 along with Isaak Iselin, Salomon Gessner, and some 20 others.

He translated the works of Tissot into German; subsequently, Hirzel published a Treatise on Rural Economy, in acquaintance with a Swiss farmer, who is distinguished for his agriculture industry and skill. Hirzel conceived the notion of publishing the result of this man's (the Swiss farmer) experience in his agricultural occupation, including facts and observations from other sources. This undertaking was published as a work entitled The Rustic Socrates, which was later translated into English by Arthur Young and into other European languages.

Hirzel also authored some historical eulogies and dialogues on religion and tolerance. He died of apoplexy on 19 February 1803.

References

External links
 Books › "Hans Caspar Hirzel"
 

1725 births
1803 deaths
Swiss writers
18th-century Swiss people
Physicians from Zürich
Deaths from bleeding
German male writers